The 2014 Telus Cup was Canada's 36th annual national midget 'AAA' hockey championship, played April 21 – 27, 2014 at Mosaic Place in Moose Jaw, Saskatchewan.  The Prince Albert Mintos defeated the Grenadiers de Châteauguay in the third overtime period of the gold medal game, which was the longest in Telus Cup history. It was the third national title for the Mintos.
The Okanagan Rockets won the bronze medal game, becoming the first British Columbian team to win a medal since 1996.

Teams

Round robin

Standings

Schedule

Playoffs

Individual awards
Most Valuable Player: Lane Michasiw (Prince Albert)
Top Scorer: Tanner Wishnowski (Okanagan)
Top Forward: Tanner Wishnowski (Okanagan)
Top Defenceman: Dawson Davidson (Moose Jaw)
Top Goaltender: Lane Michasiw and Connor Ingram (Prince Albert)
Most Sportsmanlike Player: Liam Finlay (Okanagan)
Esso Scholarship: Oliver Jacobs (Toronto)

Road to the Telus Cup

Atlantic Region
Tournament held April 3 – 6, 2014 at the Pictou County Wellness Centre in, New Glasgow, Nova Scotia.

Championship Game
Halifax 5 - Saint John 4
Halifax advances to Telus Cup

Québec
Ligue de Hockey Midget AAA du Quebec championship series

Châteauguay advances to Telus Cup

Central Region
Tournament held March 31 – April 6, 2014 at the Markham Centennial Centre in Markham, Ontario.

Semi-finals
Ottawa 1 - Ajax-Pickering 0
Toronto 6 - Markham 1

Bronze Medal Game
Ajax-Pickering 6 - Markham 0

Gold Medal Game
Toronto 4 - Ottawa 2
Toronto advances to Telus Cup

West Region
Tournament held April 3 – 6, 2014 at the Art Hauser Centre in Prince Albert, Saskatchewan.

Championship Game
Prince Albert 4 - Notre Dame 3
Prince Albert advances to Telus Cup

Pacific Region
Best-of-3 playoff series held April 4–6, 2014 played at the Red Deer Arena in Red Deer, Alberta

Okanagan advances to Telus Cup

See also
Telus Cup

References

External links
2014 Telus Cup Home Page
Midget AAA Canada Website
Midget AAA Telus Cup Regional Championship Website
Hockey Canada-Telus Cup Guide and Record Book

Telus Cup
Telus Cup
Sport in Moose Jaw
Ice hockey competitions in Saskatchewan
April 2014 sports events in Canada
2014 in Saskatchewan